Wayfarers is a 1989 Norwegian feature film directed by Ola Solum.<ref name="nf">Norsk filmografi: Landstrykere</ref> The screenplay was written by Hans Lindgren, Lars Saabye Christensen, and Solum. It is based on the 1927 novel Wayfarers'' by Knut Hamsun. The film depicts Nordland during the transition between the era of the "privileged traders" and modernity in the 1860s.
 
The film was released on DVD in 2009.

Cast
 Trond Peter Stamsø Munch as Edevart
 Marika Lagercrantz as Lovise Magrete
 Helge Jordal as August
 Liv Heløe as Ragna
 Liv Steen as Ane Maria
 Espen Skjønberg as Knoff
 John Sigurd Kristensen as Karolus
 Lasse Lindtner as Skaaro
 Hildegun Riise as Jomfru Ellingsen
 Frank Krog as Haakon Doppen

References

External links

1989 films
1980s Norwegian-language films
1989 drama films
Films based on Norwegian novels
Films directed by Ola Solum
Films based on works by Knut Hamsun
Norwegian drama films